The 2000 Connecticut Huskies football team represented the University of Connecticut in the 2000 NCAA Division I-A football season as an independent. This was Connecticut's first season competing at the NCAA Division I-A, having transitioned from NCAA Division I-AA, where they were a member of the Atlantic 10 Conference. The Huskies competed as a transitional member as they increased the scholarship count to the Division I-A level of 85. Led by Randy Edsall in his second year as head coach, Connecticut finished the season with a record of 4–8.

Schedule

References

Connecticut
UConn Huskies football seasons
Connecticut Huskies football